I Am the Law (1938) is a crime drama directed by Alexander Hall and starring Edward G. Robinson.

Plot
New York City law professor John Lindsay is asked by Eugene Ferguson, a member of the governor's Civic Committee, to become a special prosecutor to fight racketeers and corruption in the city, but unknown to Lindsay, Ferguson is in association with the racketeers.

Cast

 Edward G. Robinson as John Lindsay
 Barbara O'Neil as Jerry Lindsay
 John Beal as Paul Ferguson
 Wendy Barrie as Frances Ballou
 Otto Kruger as Eugene Ferguson
 Arthur Loft as Tom Ross
 Marc Lawrence as Eddie Girard
 Douglas Wood as  D.A.  Bert Beery
 Robert Middlemass as Moss Kithell
 Ivan Miller as Inspector  Gleason
 Charles Halton as George Leander
 Louis Jean Heydt as J.W Butler
 Fay Helm as Mrs. Butler
 Emory Parnell as Detective Brophy

References

External links

1938 films
1938 crime drama films
1930s American films
1930s English-language films
American black-and-white films
American crime drama films
Columbia Pictures films
Films about lawyers
Films directed by Alexander Hall
Films set in New York City
Films with screenplays by Jo Swerling